Sirenophila is a genus of crustose lichens in the subfamily Teloschistoideae of the family Teloschistaceae. It has four species with an Australasian distribution.

Taxonomy
The genus was circumscribed in 2013 by Ulrik Søchting, Ulf Arup, and Patrik Frödén, with Sirenophila gintarasii assigned as the type species. The generic name Sirenophila, which means "loving mermaids", alludes to the habitat preference this genus: seashore rocks in Australia and New Zealand. The authors included seven species in their original conception of the genus, but Sirenophila bermaguiana, S. gallowayi, and S. jackelixii have since been transferred to genus Elixjohnia, while S. tomareeana is now in Tarasginia.

Description
Sirenophila lichens have a crustose thallus; sometimes the edge of the thallus lacks a defined form, sometimes the thllaus comprises distinct lobes. Some species have anthraquinones as secondary compounds. The apothecia (fruiting bodies) are zeorine (where the proper exciple is enclosed in the thalline exciple) to biatorine (with a pale or colorless margin). The ascospores are polardiblastic (pierced by a narrow channel) with a long septum. Pycnidia are sometimes present. The shape of the conidia ranges from bacilliform to broadly ellipsoid.

Species

Sirenophila cliffwetmorei 
Sirenophila eos 
Sirenophila gintarasii 
Sirenophila maccarthyi

References

Teloschistales
Teloschistales genera
Taxa described in 2013
Lichen genera